Gayam is a district in Bojonegoro Regency, East Java, Indonesia. It was created in 2012 from the merger of 12 villages that previously were parts of Ngasem and Kalitidu districts. Gayam becomes a new focus of attention as Banyu Urip oil field, the petroleum exploration site of ExxonMobil under the Cepu Block contract area, is located in this district.

Administrative division
Gayam consists of 12 administrative villages listed below:

Transport
Indonesian National Route 20 runs from Babat to Caruban through Gayam. There is a flyover to provide access to the Banyu Urip site.

References

Districts of East Java
Bojonegoro Regency